Prananath College is a college in Odisha, located in the outskirts of the city of Bhubaneswar, India. The college was founded by Prananath Patnaik. The college is Affiliated to Utkal University. The college has autonomous status from UGC and holds NAAC "A" grade.

Location
The college is present outskirts of the city of Bhubaneswar. It is about 7 km from Khurdha road Junction railway station and about 5 km from Khurda Bus stand.

Courses

 Undergraduate degree courses in science, arts and commerce leading to master's degree are provided by the college.
 B.Sc (Hons) in Mathematics, Botany, Zoology, Physics, Chemistry, Geology, Geography, Electronics, and Computer Science
 B.Com (Hons) in Accounting, Finance and Marketing
 B.A (Hons) in History, Philosophy, Education, Physiology, Hindi, Odia, Sanskrit, Political Science and Economics
 BBA (Hons)
 M.Sc in Computer Science, Applied Geology
 M.A in Education, PM & IR
 M.Com

Notable alumni
Samir Mohanty- Politician

References

External links
"Official Website of Prananath College"

Colleges affiliated to Utkal University
Department of Higher Education, Odisha
Autonomous Colleges of Odisha
Universities and colleges in Bhubaneswar
Educational institutions established in 1959
1959 establishments in Orissa